The sexual abuse scandal in Providence diocese is a significant episode in the series of Catholic sex abuse cases in the United States and Ireland.

Handling by bishop Gelineau
Bishop Louis Edward Gelineau was criticized for his management of sexual abuse allegations in the Providence Diocese. He was named in several civil lawsuits.

Allegations of sexual impropriety
Gelineau himself was accused in 1997 of sexual impropriety with a boy at a Burlington orphanage in the early 1950s. He once said, "It sickens my heart to be reminded...that the terrible sickness of pedophilia rears its ugly head all too often within clerical ranks," and acknowledged that pedophilia "is certainly not a possibility [the church leadership] were readily prepared to acknowledge in the years past."

10-year-long legal battle
In September 2002, bishop Robert Edward Mulvee ended a 10-year-long (the longest in the nation) legal battle over clerical sexual abuse cases, announcing a $13.5 million settlement in 36 different lawsuits accusing a total of 10 priests and one nun of sexual misconduct. He said, "I hope that this action will be helpful to the victims of abuse and bring them in some way closer to closure and reconciliation with their God, their church, their families and themselves."

Brendan Smyth
The Diocese of Providence has listed notorious Irish pedophile clergyman Brendan Smyth as being accused of committing acts of sex abuse when he served in the Diocese of Providence. In 2013, some of alleged Smyth's alleged Rhode Island victims, both male and female, urged the Diocese of Providence to investigate Smyth. He had served in the Diocese between 1965 and 1968. Smyth later returned to Ireland, where he pled guilty to 141 counts of sexual abuse and died in prison in 1997.

Role of Kenneth Anthony Angell
Mgr. Kenneth Anthony Angell has been criticized for his management of abuse allegations during his tenure in the Diocese of Providence. In 1989 he promised to "take care of it" when a Providence priest, Rev. Normand Demers, was arrested and jailed for misconduct with boys while director and founder at The Haitian Project; Demers was later brought back to work in the diocese. He testified in a 1990 lawsuit that he did not take allegations against another priest, Rev. William O'Connell, seriously. O'Connell was later convicted and served a short sentence before moving to New Jersey, where he committed more crimes and died in prison.

Kevin R. Fisette affair
The diocese of Providence announced on August 24, 2009 that the Rev. Kevin R. Fisette had resigned as pastor of St. Leo the Great Church in Pawtucket because a "credible allegation" of sexual abuse of a minor surfaced after more than 20 years. Rhode Island police investigated the allegations that date to 1981–82 in April and found that "they were credible", said Capt. David Neill, state police detective commander.

Abuse prevention program
The Diocese of Providence enacted a program in 1993 to train and educate personnel on how to recognize and prevent child abuse. The mandate requires all personnel and volunteers that come into contact with minors to participate in child abuse prevention and reporting training every 3 years.

See also
Charter for the Protection of Children and Young People
Essential Norms
Holy Water-Gate: Abuse Cover-up in the Catholic Church, a 2004 documentary that focuses on the abuse that took place in Rhode Island during the 1980s and '90s
National Review Board
Pontifical Commission for the Protection of Minors

References

External links
Audits, Child And Youth Protection; US Conference of Catholic Bishops
Charter For The Protection Of Children And Young People; US Conference of Catholic Bishops
Child And Youth Protection; US Conference of Catholic Bishops
National Review Board,  Child And Youth Protection; US Conference of Catholic Bishops
Safe Environment, Child And Youth Protection; US Conference of Catholic Bishops
Victim Assistance, Child And Youth Protection; US Conference of Catholic Bishops

Incidents of violence against boys
Child sexual abuse in the United States
Catholic Church sexual abuse scandals in the United States